Jesús David Emiliano Endrizzi (born 7 March 1994) is an Argentine professional footballer who plays as a left-back for Independiente Rivadavia.

Career
Endrizzi, having joined their system in 2009 from San Lorenzo, was promoted into Instituto's senior team during the 2013–14 Primera B Nacional, making his bow in a 1–1 draw away to Boca Unidos on 25 August 2013. Nine further appearances followed that season, though just one was a start; versus Defensa y Justicia in December. The first goal of Endrizzi's career came against Estudiantes in June 2015, which was followed just under two years later with his 100th appearance in all competitions during a Primera B Nacional loss to Guillermo Brown on 10 May 2017.

Career statistics
.

References

External links

1994 births
Living people
People from Catamarca Province
Argentine footballers
Association football defenders
Primera Nacional players
Instituto footballers
Independiente Rivadavia footballers